Ostroróg is a town in Poland.

Ostroróg may also refer to:
 Ostroróg, West Pomeranian Voivodeship, a village in north-west Poland
 Ostroróg, part of the district of Grunwald in Poznań, western Poland
 Ostroróg family:
 Mikołaj Ostroróg (1593–1651), Polish nobleman
 Stanisław Julian Ostroróg (1830–1890), portrait photographer
 Leon Walerian Ostroróg  (1867 - 1932), Polish jurist, writer, Islamic scholar, and adviser to the Ottoman government